Boris Andreyevich Pavlov (Russian: Борис Андреевич Павлов, 21 March 1947 – 2008) was a Russian weightlifter who won a world title in 1971. Next year he won a European title and competed at the 1972 Olympics, but failed to complete the press event. Between 1969 and 1972 Pavlov set six ratified world records.

Pavlov spent his last 20 years in Furmanov, where a memorial weightlifting tournament is held in his honor after his death.

References

1947 births
2008 deaths
Soviet male weightlifters
World Weightlifting Championships medalists
Olympic weightlifters of the Soviet Union
Weightlifters at the 1972 Summer Olympics
World record setters in weightlifting
European Weightlifting Championships medalists